Orania is a genus of the palm tree family Arecaceae, and includes flowering plants native to Southeast Asia, Madagascar, and New Guinea.

Species
Accepted species:

 Orania archboldiana Burret - New Guinea
 Orania bakeri A.P.Keim & J.Dransf. - New Guinea
 Orania dafonsoroensis A.P.Keim & J.Dransf. - New Guinea
 Orania decipiens Becc. - Philippines
 Orania deflexa A.P.Keim & J.Dransf. - Papua New Guinea
 Orania disticha Burret - Papua New Guinea
 Orania ferruginea A.P.Keim & J.Dransf. - New Guinea 
 Orania gagavu Essig - New Guinea
 Orania glauca Essig - New Guinea
 Orania grandiflora A.P.Keim & J.Dransf. - New Guinea
 Orania lauterbachiana Becc. - New Guinea
 Orania littoralis A.P.Keim & J.Dransf. - Papua New Guinea
 Orania longisquama (Jum.) J.Dransf. & N.W.Uhl - Madagascar
 Orania longistaminodia A.P.Keim & J.Dransf. - Papua New Guinea
 Orania macropetala K.Schum. & Lauterb.	 - Papua New Guinea
 Orania micrantha Becc. - Papua New Guinea
 Orania oreophila Essig - Papua New Guinea
 Orania palindan (Blanco) Merr. - New Guinea, Maluku, Sulawesi, Philippines
 Orania paraguanensis Becc. - Sabah, Palawan
 Orania parva Essig - New Guinea
 Orania ravaka Beentje - Madagascar
 Orania regalis Zipp. - New Guinea, Aru Islands
 Orania subdisticha A.P.Keim & J.Dransf. - Papua New Guinea
 Orania sylvicola (Griff.) H.E.Moore - Thailand, Malaysia, Borneo, Java, Sumatra 
 Orania tabubilensis A.P.Keim & J.Dransf. - New Guinea
 Orania timikae A.P.Keim & J.Dransf. - New Guinea
 Orania trispatha (J.Dransf. & N.W.Uhl) Beentje & J.Dransf. - Madagascar
 Orania zonae A.P.Keim & J.Dransf. - New Guinea

References

 

 
Arecaceae genera
Neotropical realm flora